Suicide Society is the fifteenth album by the Canadian heavy metal band Annihilator. It was released on September 18, 2015 by UDR Music, and is the first album to feature guitarist and bandleader Jeff Waters performing lead vocals on all tracks since 1997's Remains, due to the departure of vocalist and rhythm guitarist Dave Padden in December 2014. It also marks the return of bassist Cam Dixon, who toured with the band from 1994 to 1995, as well as the addition of new guitarist Aaron Homma, both of whom are credited with providing backing vocals in the liner notes.

On this album, Jeff Waters handled all instrumental work in the studio apart from the drums, played by returning drummer Mike Harshaw. The album marks the final studio appearance of Harshaw, who announced via his Facebook page in May 2016 that he had parted ways with the band in order to spend more time with his family and pursue other musical interests.

A music video for the title track was released on July 31, 2015. A lyric video for the song "Creepin' Again" was released on August 17. Another single was released, "My Revenge" on September 15, 2015. "Snap" released another music video on October 1, 2015.

The song "Break, Enter" was penned about a personal experience Waters had chasing down criminals who had broken into his home. The bonus disc "The Ravenstreet Sessions" is a typical Annihilator concert setlist that was recorded with vocalist/guitarist Dave Padden still in the band before heading to Europe for their 2013 summer tour.

Track listing

Personnel
Annihilator
Jeff Waters – lead vocals, lead guitar, rhythm guitar, bass, production, engineering, mixing, mastering
Mike Harshaw – drums, backing vocals
Aaron Homma – backing vocals, live rhythm guitar
Cam Dixon – backing vocals, live bass

Production
Gyula Havancsák – cover art, artwork, design

Charts

References

Annihilator (band) albums
2015 albums